Major-General Sir Samuel Hickson, KBE, CB (14 November 1859 – 22 March 1928) was a British Army officer in the Royal Army Medical Corps.

References 

1859 births
1928 deaths
Alumni of Trinity College Dublin
Knights Commander of the Order of the British Empire
Companions of the Order of the Bath
British Army generals of World War I
Royal Army Medical Corps officers
19th-century British medical doctors
20th-century British medical doctors